The Gallauistöck is a mountain of the Bernese Alps, overlooking Guttannen in the Bernese Oberland. It lies north of the Ritzlihorn on the range separating the Urbachtal from the main Aar valley.

On the south side of the mountain lies the Mattenalpsee.

References

External links
 Gallauistöck on Hikr

Mountains of the Alps
Mountains of Switzerland
Mountains of the canton of Bern
Two-thousanders of Switzerland